Rainham railway station is on the London, Tilbury and Southend line, serving the town of Rainham in the London Borough of Havering, east London. Historically in the county of Essex, in official literature the station is sometimes shown as Rainham (Essex) in order to distinguish it from the station of the same name in Kent.

Its three-letter station code is RNM and it is within Travelcard zone 6.

It was opened in 1854. The station and all trains serving it are currently operated by c2c.

History
The station was opened in 1854 on the original route of the London, Tilbury and Southend Railway from London to Tilbury, which was extended to Southend-on-Sea in 1856 and Shoeburyness in 1884. In 1888 a second, more direct, route to Southend was completed several miles to the north.

Location 
The station is located on Ferry Lane, close to the junction with Wennington Road. Major industrial works surround the station, as does Rainham Creek, a local industrial river. Access is provided from the station building to the country-bound platform; in order to access the London-bound platforms, a pedestrian bridge must be crossed. There are ticket barriers at the front entrance to the platform, restricting platform access to ticket-holders only.

The roads served by the crossings have now been severed by the High Speed 1 line between Ebbsfleet and London St. Pancras, but the level crossings are still in situ, such as the one on Ferry Lane. This can be used to access the London-bound platform. A number of footbridges and road bridges have been built to replace them.

There is access to the Rainham Marshes via a footbridge immediately south of the station, although Purfleet station is the closest railway station.

Beam Park railway station is a new station under construction to the west of Rainham.

Services 

The typical off-peak service frequency is:

 2 trains per hour (tph) westbound to London Fenchurch Street;

During peak times there are additional services including some connecting to other sections of the line beyond Grays.

Connections
London Buses routes 103,  and 372 serve the station directly. London Buses routes 165, 287 and London Buses school route 652 serve the station from Rainham War Memorial stop.

References

External links

Railway stations in the London Borough of Havering
DfT Category C2 stations
Former London, Tilbury and Southend Railway stations
Railway stations in Great Britain opened in 1854
Railway stations served by c2c